Aleksander Gabelic (born 17 September 1965) is a Swedish politician and former member of the Riksdag, the national legislature. A member of the Social Democratic Party, he represented Östergötland County between October 2006 and October 2010. He was a member of the European Parliament between April 2018 and July 2019. He was a member of the municipal council in Linköping Municipality and chairman of the Swedish UN Federation (Svenska FN-förbundet).

References

1965 births
Living people
Members of the Riksdag 2006–2010
Members of the Riksdag from the Social Democrats
MEPs for Sweden 2014–2019
Swedish Social Democratic Party MEPs